The 2010-11 Botola is the 54th season of the Moroccan Premier League. It began on 21 August 2010. Wydad Casablanca are the holders of the title.

Overview

Average attendance

 Wydad 20,000
 Raja 17,000
 FAR 11,000
 KAC 11,000
 Maghreb de Fès 10,000
 Difaa El Jadida 9,000
 Kawkab Marrakech 7,000
 MAT 7,000
 Hassania 6,000
 JSM 5,000
 Safi 4,000
 Ittihad Khémisset 1,000
 Salé 1,000
 Olympique Khouribga 900
 Wydad de Fès 800
 FUS 200

Stadia and locations 

Source: Soccerway.com

League table

CODM Meknès also qualified for the 2012 CAF Confederation Cup as the 2011 Coupe du Trône finalist.

See also 
2010–11 GNF 2

References

External links 

 Season at soccerway.com

Botola seasons
Morroco
1